This is a list of episodes for the television series Racket Squad.

Series overview

Episodes

Season 1 (1951)

Season 2 (1951–52)

Season 3 (1952–53)

External links
 

Racket Squad